Rayat Shikshan Sanstha's Karmaveer Bhaurao Patil College (formerly known as Modern College ) is a college in Juhu Nagar (Vashi) Navi Mumbai. The college was established in 1979 and was affiliated with the University of Mumbai, but is now conferred with Autonomy since 2018. The college is named after Karmaveer Bhaurao Patil, a social activist and educationist and the founder of the Rayat Education Society. In 2017 College Accredited by NAAC with A+ & 'Best College Award' by University of Mumbai.

The college offers 3 year Bachelor's and 2 year master's degrees in the fields of Arts, Science, and Commerce. It also has a junior college XI and XII (+2 level) which offers Higher Secondary course in Arts, Commerce and Science streams under Maharashtra State Board of Secondary and Higher Secondary Education.

Apart from the Mumbai University courses the college also runs following courses:
 National Service Scheme
 National Cadet Core
 Yashwantrao Chavan Maharashtra Open University - Bachelor of Arts degrees and Bachelor of Commerce degrees through correspondence cum coaching.
 Diploma in Medical Laboratory Technology (DMLT).
 Certified course in Computer Science with MS Office.
 Minimum Competency Courses in
 Medical Laboratory Technique
 Marketing and Salesmanship
 Building Maintenance

Address
Rayat Shikshan Sanstha's Karmaveer Bhaurao Patil College (Modern College)
Sector 15 A, Juhunagar Vashi,
Navi Mumbai-400703.

References

External links
 Rayat Shikshan Sanstha

Education in Navi Mumbai
Affiliates of the University of Mumbai